Gemme may refer to:

 Gemme, an album by French musician Nolwenn Leroy and "Gemme", a song on the album

See also 
 Gemma (disambiguation)
 Sainte-Gemme (disambiguation)